Nacer Barazite (born 27 May 1990) is a Dutch professional footballer who can play either as an attacking midfielder or striker. Most recently, he played for Thai club Buriram United.

Barazite has during his career played for, among others, English clubs Arsenal and Derby County, Dutch sides Vitesse and Utrecht, Austrian team Austria Wien and French club Monaco.

He is a Dutch youth international, and has gained nine caps for the Netherlands U21 team.

Club career

Arsenal
Born in Arnhem, Barazite started his career as a youth player with NEC Nijmegen. He joined Arsenal in 2006 and regularly featured for the U18 and Reserve teams throughout 2006–07. Whilst playing in Arsenal's academy, Barazite helped take the gooners to the semifinals of the 2006–07 FA Youth Cup. He signed a professional contract with the club in August 2007, having scored for the first team in a pre-season friendly against Barnet the previous month.

Barazite made his competitive Arsenal first-team début on 31 October 2007, as a substitute for Eduardo da Silva against Sheffield United in a League Cup Fourth Round match. His second appearance also came as a substitute, for Mark Randall in Arsenal's League Cup quarter-final against Blackburn Rovers on 18 December 2007, but after only 17 minutes on the pitch he was stretchered off with a dislocated shoulder, and replaced by Fran Mérida.

Barazite returned to reserve-team action after his injury, and scored his first hat trick for Arsenal in the under-18s, in a 5–2 win over Southampton. The other two were scored by Luke Freeman. Barazite was also named on the Arsenal bench for the final Premier League game against Sunderland on 11 May 2008, but was not brought on.

Barazite featured in Arsenal's preseason campaign for 2008–09, scoring for Arsenal in a 2–1 win against Barnet in a pre-season friendly at Underhill in July. On 19 August 2008, Barazite joined Championship side Derby County, initially until the end of the year but extended the loan until the end of the season. Barazite was named Man of the Match as Derby won their first game for a week short of a year, despite coming off the bench at half time. He was instrumental in the 2–1 win and set up the winner late in the game. On 29 December 2008, it was confirmed that his loan spell at Derby County was to be extended until the end of the 2008–09 season. He scored his first goal for Derby and also set up a goal, on 18 February at home to Blackpool in a 4–1 victory.

Barazite again featured in Arsenal's preseason campaign for 2009–10, scoring a third time for Arsenal in a 2–2 draw against Barnet in a pre-season friendly at Underhill on 18 July 2009. Barazite was involved in Arsenal's 2–0 win over West Brom in the League Cup where he replaced Armand Traoré in the 69th minute of play. He then suffered a shoulder injury which kept him out of the game for four months.

On 10 August 2010, it was announced that Barazite had gone on trial for Scottish club, Rangers, with view to a season-long loan at the Scottish club. He played 77 minutes of Rangers friendly against Glentoran. Despite losing 2–1, Barazite impressed the club.

On the transfer deadline, he joined the Dutch club Vitesse Arnhem on loan for the entire 2010–11 season. On 11 September 2010, he made his debut, making his first start, in a 1–0 loss against Heerenveen. In the third round of KNVB Cup, he scored twice in a 6–0 win over Flevo Boys; followed his third in the fourth of KNVB Cup in a 3–0 win over Rijnsburgse Boys. However, Vitesse decided to terminate the loan deal in December 2010.

Austria Wien

On 31 January 2011, Barazite signed a contract with Austrian giants Austria Wien. The contract was due to keep him at the club until 2013. He played his first game on 12 February 2011; scored his first goal in Austria Wien's 4–0 victory over Wiener Neustadt on 19 February 2011 and also set up a goal in the match. On 11 May 2011, Barazite received a red card for the first time in his professional career after a second bookable offence in a 1–1 draw against Sturm Graz. In his first half season at Austria Wien, the club finished third place, resulting a qualification in a Europa League. For Barazite, he became a regular in the first team, playing in the striker position and scored four goals in sixteen appearances.

The next season was a bigger role for Barazite as he soon have more develop more scoring form in the league and European. In Europa League's Qualifiers, Barazite scored in both legs in the second round against Rudar Pljevlja; twice in the first leg and once in the second leg. In third round against Olimpija Ljubljana, though not scoring in the first leg in a 1–1 draw, he would score a hat-trick in a 3–2 win. Soon after in a Qualification Round of Europa League first leg, he scored a brace in a 3–1 win over CS Gaz Metan Mediaș and would go through to the group stage, despite losing 1–0 in the second leg. Three days later, he scored his first of the season in a 3–0 win over rival Rapid Wien. With eight goals all in Europa League becoming the highest tally of any player in the competition, Barazite says that was his best time of his career In the Group stage, Barazite would score three times against Malmö twice in two separate legs and once against AZ. But Vienna was out of the Europa League with two wins, two draws and two losses, having same point with AZ, but only a few goal differences than AZ. Elsewhere in the league, he scored more goals, like last season, with eight, including a brace against Admira Wacker Mödling on 19 November 2011.

AS Monaco
In January 2012, Barazite signed with AS Monaco on a four-year contract with a transfer fee of €4.5 million. He made his debut in February 2012, in a 1–0 home defeat against Bastia. However his first half of the season at AS Monaco was a reduced playing time after striking partnership of Valère Germain and Ibrahima Touré took his place in the first team and for him as he made seven appearances. The next season, Barazite scored his first goal for the club in the Coupe de la Ligue in a 1–1 draw against Nîmes and Monaco would eventually win on penalties.

Return to Austria Wien
On 30 January 2013, Barazite rejoined Austria Vienna on loan until the end of the season, with an option to make the deal permanent for a speculated €1 million. Upon the move, Chief Financial Officer Markus Kraetschmer claimed that Barazite had become disillusioned during his time at Monaco and had renounced money, instead wanting to play.

On his return, Barazite made his first appearance since leaving Austria Wien coming on as a substitute against derby rival Rapid Wien and provided the assist for Philipp Hosiner's winning goal. Soon after Barazite suffered a knee injury requiring surgery. Two months later, on 28 April 2013 and towards the end of the season, Barazite made his return coming on as a substitute for Hosiner near full-time in a 2–0 win over Admira Wacker Mödling. In an interview, Barazite expressed his desire to stay at the club after the end of the loan spell. On 11 May 2013, he scored his first goal after his return from injury before setting up Hosiner for the third goal in a 3–0 win over Wacker Innsbruck. The season ended with the club winning the league title for the first time in seven years.

Return to Monaco
Barazite went on to pick up a winners medal from being capped in Monaco's victorious Ligue 2 campaign of that season.

Utrecht
On 26 June 2014, it was announced that Eredivisie side FC Utrecht had signed Barazite.

Al Jazira
On 2 September 2018 Al Jazira has signed Dutch midfielder Nacer Barazite for on seasons by buying the player's card from Yeni Malatyaspor represent Al Jazira from the new season of the UAE Pro-League . On 2 September Barazite was appointed by the Al Jazira.

Buriram United

In 2019, he signed for Buriram United in Thailand.

International career
Barazite has played for the Netherlands national under-17 football team, being a member of the side in the 2007 UEFA European Under-17 Football Championship; he scored in the Netherlands' 2–2 draw with Belgium, but the Netherlands did not progress beyond the group stage. He was a regular in the U-19 team for the 2009 European Championship qualifying campaign that ended when they narrowly missed out on a tournament spot on goal difference in the elite qualification stage. On 9 October, he made his first appearance in the 2011 U-21 European Championship qualifying, coming on as a second-half substitute.

Career statistics

Personal life
Barazite has a son.

Honours
AS Monaco
Ligue 2: 2013

Austria Wien
Austrian Bundesliga: 2013

References

External links
 
 
 Netherlands stats at OnsOranje

1990 births
Living people
Footballers from Arnhem
Dutch footballers
Dutch expatriate footballers
Dutch expatriate sportspeople in Monaco
Dutch expatriate sportspeople in England
Dutch expatriate sportspeople in Austria
Dutch expatriate sportspeople in Turkey
Dutch expatriate sportspeople in Thailand
Dutch expatriate sportspeople in the United Arab Emirates
Netherlands under-21 international footballers
Netherlands youth international footballers
Expatriate footballers in England
Expatriate footballers in Austria
Expatriate footballers in Turkey
Expatriate footballers in the United Arab Emirates
Expatriate footballers in Thailand
Association football midfielders
NEC Nijmegen players
Arsenal F.C. players
Derby County F.C. players
SBV Vitesse players
FK Austria Wien players
AS Monaco FC players
FC Utrecht players
Yeni Malatyaspor footballers
Al Jazira Club players
Nacer Barazite
English Football League players
Eredivisie players
Austrian Football Bundesliga players
Ligue 2 players
Süper Lig players
UAE Pro League players
Nacer Barazite
Expatriate footballers in Monaco